Tigrigobius nesiotes is a species of goby native to the eastern Pacific islands of the Galapagos, Cocos Island and Gorgona Island dwelling deep in rock crevices.  This species is a cleaner fish notably cleaning Whitetip reef sharks (Triaenodon obesus) who will wait in substantial numbers for service.  This species grows to a length of  SL.

References

nesiotes
Monotypic fish genera
Fish described in 1990